Lawley is a surname. Notable people with the surname include:

 Melissa Lawley (born 1994), English association footballer
 Robyn Lawley (born 1989), Australian model
 Sue Lawley (born 1946), English broadcaster
 William R. Lawley, Jr. (1920–1999), United States Army Air Forces officer
Wenlock Lawleys
 Richard Lawley (died 1569), English MP
 Robert Lawley, 1st Baron Wenlock (1768–1834), British landowner and politician
 Beilby Lawley, 2nd Baron Wenlock (1818–1880), English nobleman
 Francis Charles Lawley (1825–1901), British journalist and politician
 Beilby Lawley, 3rd Baron Wenlock (1849–1912), English nobleman
 Arthur Lawley, 6th Baron Wenlock, Governor of Western Australia from 1901 to 1902
 Sir Francis Lawley, 2nd Baronet (c. 1630 – 1696)
 Sir Robert Lawley, 5th Baronet (1736–1793), English landowner and politician